Mounica is an Indian film and television actress who works predominantly in Telugu movie and television industry. Her big break was in MAATV's show Radha Madhu as Madhu (Madhulika).

Career
Mounica made her debut in Tollywood with Mahesh Babu starrer Athadu (2005). She also acted in  Chukkallo Chandrudu (2006) as the sister of Sadha which brought the opportunity of a lead role in Just Yellow Team's Radha Madhu, which aired on MAATV (2006–08). She won hearts of many with her natural performance.

Mounica has received a lot of lead opportunities in television, including roles in Laya, Raktha Sambandham, Kunkuma Rekha, Arundhathi, Janaki Weds Raghuram, etc.

Mounica acted simultaneously in south Indian films Oka Oorilo, Stalin, Annavaram, Vijayadasami, Josh, Vettaikaran, etc.

She also acted in the TV shows Abhishekam (ETV) and Rama Seetha (Zee Telugu),Ranivasam(GeminiTV) .

Filmography
 Oka Oorilo (2005)
 Athadu (2005)
 Chukkallo Chandrudu (2006)
 Stalin (2006)
 Annavaram (2006)
 Vijayadasami (2007)
 Josh (2009)
 Vettaikaran (2009)
 Sher (film)(2015)
 Ninnu Kori (2017)
 Sarkaru Vaari Paata (2022)

Television

References

Living people
Telugu actresses
Year of birth missing (living people)
Indian television actresses
Indian soap opera actresses
Indian film actresses
Actresses in Telugu television
Actresses in Tamil television
Actresses in Telugu cinema
Actresses in Tamil cinema
21st-century Indian actresses